{{Album ratings
| rev1      = AllMusic
| rev1Score = <ref name = "AMG">Brett Hartenbach, [ "Review: Live Shots"], Allmusic</ref>
|rev2=Robert Christgau
|rev2Score= B+
|rev3=Rolling Stone 
|rev3Score=(favorable)
}}Live Shots is a live album recorded in London by American country outfit the Joe Ely Band during a 1980 tour supporting the Clash.  The tour occurred at a high point in the Clash's popularity just after the release of the album London Calling.

The album was first only released in the UK, but a US release soon followed due to high demand.  The 1993 reissue CD included the tracks from the Texas Special bonus EP that had accompanied the Live Shots LP.

 Track listing 
All songs by Joe Ely, except as indicated.

Side One (of original LP):
 "Fingernails" — 3:00 
 "Midnight Shift" (Jimmie Ainsworth, Earl Lee) — 3:00 
 "Honky Tonk Masquerade" — 3:49 
 "Honky Tonkin'" (Hank Williams) — 3:12 
 "Long Snake Moan" (Arranged and adapted by Ely) — 5:10

Side Two:
 "I Had My Hopes up High" — 3:13 
 "She Never Spoke Spanish to Me" (Butch Hancock) — 3:53 
 "Johnny's Blues" — 4:48 
 "Fools Fall in Love" (Butch Hancock) — 4:37 
 "Boxcars" (Butch Hancock) — 4:37'Texas Special EP:'''
 "Crazy Lemon" — 3:56 
 "Not Fade Away" (Norman Petty, Charles Hardin) — 3:42 
 "Treat Me Like a Saturday Night" (Jimmie Dale Gilmore) — 3:09 
 "Wishin' for You" (Butch Hancock) — 4:41

Live Shots credits

The Joe Ely Band 
 Joe Ely — electric guitar & vocals
 Ponty Bone — accordion 
 Robert Marquam — drums 
 Jesse Taylor — electric lead guitar   
 Gregg Wright (credited as "Greg Wright") — bass 
 Lloyd Maines — pedal steel and background vocals

Guest musicians 
 Carlene Carter — vocals on "Honky Tonkin'"
 Mick Gallagher — keyboards
 Reese Wynans — keyboards

Production 
 Recorded live in London, a Free Flow Production in association with Joe Ely
 Produced by Michael Brovsky
 Engineered by Chet Himes, Remix-Pecan Street Studios, Austin, Texas
 Assistant Engineer — Greg Klinginsmith 
 Live Engineer Wayne (Hatch) Hatchel

Artwork 
 Graphics & design — Guy Juke, Austin, Texas
 Artwork — Cream, Bayswater, London
 Snapshots — Pete Vernon
 Repackage design — Carmelo Roman
 Liner notes — Max Bell

Texas Special credits

Musicians 

 Michael Robberson — bass guitar
 Michael Kindred — keyboards 
 "Smokey" Joe Miller — saxophone,

Production 
 Produced by Al Kooper
 Recorded live in Texas by Reelsound
 Engineered by Bob Edwards
 Remixed at Studio South, Austin, Texas
 "Not Fade Away" recording courtesy of WLIR in New York City

Artwork 
 Photography/design — Patti Heid/Art Ache
 Ely lettering — Guy Juke
 Art production — Dick Reeves and John Wilson, Austin, Texas

Charts

Releases

References

External links 
 Discography at www.ely.com

Joe Ely albums
Live EPs
1980 live albums
1980 EPs
Albums produced by Al Kooper
MCA Records live albums
MCA Records EPs